The 2020–21 season is Fortitudo Bologna's 89th in existence and the club's 2nd consecutive season in the top tier Italian basketball.

Overview 
After a successful, although incomplete, 2019-20 season as a newly promoted team, Bologna was able to raise the bar of the ambition and compete in the Basketball Champions League for the 2020-21 season.

Kit 
Supplier: Nike / Sponsor: Lavoropiù

Players

Current roster

Depth chart

Squad changes

In

|}

Out
Leonardo Totè ended the season on loan to Bilbao Basket. The loan was finalized on the last match of the season and the team agreed wishing to give Totè the opportunity to build an experience in a foreign competition.

|}

Confirmed 

|}

Coach

Competitions

Supercup

Serie A

Champions League

Regular season

See also 

 2020–21 LBA season
 2020–21 Basketball Champions League
 2020 Italian Basketball Supercup

References 

2020–21 Basketball Champions League
2020–21 in Italian basketball by club